Revelation 15 is the fifteenth chapter of the Book of Revelation or the Apocalypse of John in the New Testament of the Christian Bible. The book is traditionally attributed to John the Apostle, but the precise identity of the author remains a point of academic debate. This chapter includes the hymn of Moses and the Lamb  and introduces the seven angels who appear with seven plagues.

Text
The original text was written in Koine Greek. This chapter is divided into 8 verses; it is the shortest chapter in the book.

Textual witnesses
Some early manuscripts containing the text of this chapter are among others:
Papyrus 115 (c. AD 275; extant verses 1, 4–7)
Papyrus 47 (3rd century; complete)
Codex Sinaiticus (330-360)
Codex Alexandrinus (400-440)
Codex Ephraemi Rescriptus (c. 450; complete)
Papyrus 43 (6th/7th century; extant verse 8)

Old Testament reference
Revelation 15:4: Psalm

The Song of the Conquerors (15:1–4)
Those who have the victory over the beast, over his image and over his mark, and over the number of his name, sing the song of Moses (as in the Song of the Sea from ) and the song of the Lamb, because "they overcame him by the blood of the Lamb".

Verse 1
Then I saw another sign in heaven, great and marvelous: seven angels having the seven last plagues, for in them the wrath of God is complete.

Verse 2
And I saw something like a sea of glass mingled with fire, and those who have the victory over the beast, over his image and over his mark and over the number of his name, standing on the sea of glass, having harps of God.
For "mingled with fire", the New International Version suggests "glowing with fire". A sea of glass, like crystal, has previously appeared in chapter 4, although German theologian Johannes Ebrard suggests they are different seas of glass.

Heinrich Meyer notes that the "harps of God" are "such as serve only for the praise of God".

Verses 3–4
 They sing the song of Moses, the servant of God, and the song of the Lamb, saying:
"Great and marvelous are Your works,
Lord God Almighty!
Just and true are Your ways,
O King of the saints!
 Who shall not fear You, O Lord, and glorify Your name?
For You alone are holy.
For all nations shall come and worship before You,
For Your judgments have been manifested."

The wording O King of the saints! appears in the Textus Receptus, but Meyer argues that this reading is "almost without any testimony" in the early manuscripts. Alternative readings are:
O King of the nations! 
O King of the ages! 
O King of the heavens! 

Verse 4 contains a citation from Psalm 86.

Introduction to the Seven Bowls (15:5–16:1)
It is a continuation of 'the anticipatory vision' of Revelation 15:1, which states that these seven plagues are the last ones.

Verse 5
The temple of the tabernacle of the testimony in heaven was opened.
, may also be translated as "the temple of the tabernacle of witness in the heaven". Acts 7 records St Stephen's contrast between the tabernacle or tent of witness in the wilderness and the real home of the Most High:
Heaven is My throne,
And earth is My footstool.
This verse echoes , showing the relationship with the seventh trumpet, just as the seven trumpets are related to the seventh seal.

Verse 6
And out of the temple came the seven angels having the seven plagues, clothed in pure bright linen, and having their chests girded with golden bands.

Verses 7-8
 Then one of the four living creatures gave the seven angels seven gold bowls full of the anger of God, who lives forever and ever.  The temple was filled with smoke from the glory and power of God, and no one could go into the temple until the seven plagues brought by the seven angels had come to an end.

See also
 Book of Daniel
 Jesus Christ
 John's vision of the Son of Man
 Moses
 Names and titles of Jesus in the New Testament
 Seven bowls
 Song of the Sea
 Related Bible parts: Exodus 15, Revelation 4, Revelation 7, Revelation 13, Revelation 14

Notes

References

External links
 King James Bible - Wikisource
English Translation with Parallel Latin Vulgate 
Online Bible at GospelHall.org (ESV, KJV, Darby, American Standard Version, Bible in Basic English)
Multiple bible versions at Bible Gateway (NKJV, NIV, NRSV etc.)

15